iome is a British technology company that provides digital location-based services to consumers.  Via internet and mobile services, iome’s technology links activities, interests, locations, routes and places so people can plan ahead and make bookings, based on personal preferences and their location. iome has offices in London and Ipswich. It is publicly listed on the Hong Kong Stock Exchange.

iome was the technology company behind the launch of the BT MyPlace service in February 2009 and Plotstar in November 2009.

The CEO of iome is Phil Eames.

History
The company was created as io global in May 2005 by British Telecommunications and New Venture Partners after five years development in BT’s Research Laboratories.    The company rebranded as iome in May 2009.

External links
 archived webpage
 https://web.archive.org/web/20091126044442/http://plotstar.com/
 http://www.btmyplace.com
 http://www.westminster.gov.uk
 http://www.entrepreneurcountry.net/articles/entrepreneur-interviews/169-phil-eames-iome
 http://www.utalkmarketing.com/Pages/Article.aspx?ArticleID=14872&Title=How_to_develop_a_mobile_marketing_campaign

Technology companies of the United Kingdom
Technology companies established in 2004